Florian Gamper (born 3 August 1999) is an Austrian racing cyclist, who currently rides for UCI Continental team .

His brothers Mario Gamper and Patrick Gamper are also professional cyclists.

Major results
2019
 10th Croatia–Slovenia

References

External links

1999 births
Living people
Austrian male cyclists
Place of birth missing (living people)
European Games competitors for Austria
Cyclists at the 2019 European Games
21st-century Austrian people